The Lesotho national badminton team represents Lesotho in international team competitions and is controlled by the Lesotho Badminton Association, the governing body for Lesotho badminton.

The national team debuted in the African Badminton Championships in 2023.

History 
The Lesotho badminton team was formed after the establishment of the Lesotho Badminton Association in 1999 under the Lesotho Sports & Recreation Commission development program. The national team later became affiliated to the Badminton World Federation in 2018 and were part of the BWF Shuttle Time program which was aimed to develop and progress badminton in the country.

The national team made their first international team event appearance at the 2023 African Badminton Championships. The team sent a total of 4 players and were eliminated in the group stages.

Participation in BCA competitions 
Mixed team

Current squad 
The following players were selected to represent Lesotho at the All Africa Mixed Team Badminton Championships 2023.

Men
Neo Rahlolo
Tebello Selemela

Women
Khahliso Khetheng
Refiloe Moeletsi

References 

Badminton
National badminton teams
Badminton in Lesotho